Miriam Higareda (born August 24, 1984, in Mexico City, Mexico) is a Mexican actress.

Filmography
  Tanto Amor  (2015) 
 Cásese quien pueda  (2014)
 Vivir a Destiempo (2013)
 Emperatriz (2011)... Elena Mendoza del Real
 Te presento a Laura (2009) (movie)
 Mujer Comprada (2009)
 Cambio de Vida (2008)
 Se busca un hombre (2007)

Theatre 

 Violinista en el Tejado (2011)... Chava
 El Diario De Ana Frank (2009)... Ana Frank

References

External links

1984 births
Living people
Mexican telenovela actresses
Mexican television actresses
Mexican film actresses
Mexican stage actresses
Actresses from Tabasco
21st-century Mexican actresses
Actresses from Mexico City
People educated at Centro de Estudios y Formación Actoral
People from Mexico City